Saijō or Saijo may refer to:

Saijō (surname), a Japanese surname
Saijō, Ehime, is a city in Ehime Prefecture, Japan
Iyo-Saijō Station, a railway station in Saijō, Ehime 
Saijō, Hiroshima (Kamo), a former town in Kamo District, Hiroshima Prefecture, Japan
Saijō Sake Matsuri, a festival held in Saijō, Hiroshima (Kamo)
Saijō, Hiroshima (Shōbara),  a former town in Hiba District, Hiroshima, Japan
Saijō Station, a railway station in Higashihiroshima, Hiroshima Prefecture, Japan
Bingo-Saijō Station, a railway station  in Ōsa, Saijō-chō, Shōbara, Hiroshima Prefecture, Japan